Akes is an unincorporated community in Polk County, in the U.S. state of Georgia.

History
Variant names were "Akes Station" and "Berry". A post office called Berry was established in 1884, and remained in operation until 1912. In 1900, the community had 46 inhabitants.

References

Unincorporated communities in Polk County, Georgia
Unincorporated communities in Georgia (U.S. state)